Dvergen Hill is a small, isolated rock hill about  north of Fuglefjellet in the Sverdrup Mountains of Queen Maud Land, Antarctic. It was photographed from the air by the Third German Antarctic Expedition (1938–39). It was mapped by Norwegian cartographers from surveys and air photos by the Norwegian–British–Swedish Antarctic Expedition (1949–52) and from air photos by the Norwegian expedition (1958–59) and named Dvergen (the dwarf).

References 

Hills of Queen Maud Land
Princess Martha Coast